The Ukrainian Cup 1993–94 was the third annual edition of Ukraine's football knockout competition, known as the Ukrainian Cup.

The Cup started with the round of 32, but it also had couple of preliminaries. The tournament started on August 1, 1993, with numerous games across the country and concluded with its final game on May 29, 1994. The last season defending champion FC Dynamo Kyiv was eliminated in the Round of 16 by FC Veres Rivne on the away goal rule. This season cup holders became FC Chornomorets Odessa that in the final defeated the Crimean SC Tavriya Simferopol on the penalty shootout.

Kryvbas Kryvyi Rih served its suspension for refusing to play last season and was not included in competition for the season.

Team allocation 
 Eighty teams entered the competition.
 3 professional clubs did not enter (Second League: Hazovyk Komarne, Medita Shakhtarsk; Top League: Kryvbas Kryvyi Rih)
 14 out of 18 teams of the Transitional League did not enter
 7 regions did not provide their representatives (AR Crimea, Chernihiv, Kyiv, Kyiv City, Kirovohrad, Rivne, Zaporizhzhia)

Distribution

First qualifying round entrants 
 19 regional representatives
 4 Third League (Dynamo Saky, FC Lviv, Nyva Karapyshi, Torpedo Melitopol)
 20 Second League in whole (Azovets Mariupol, Bazhanovets Makiivka, Chaika Sevastopol, Chornomorets-2 Odesa, Dnister Zalishchyky, Druzhba Berdiansk, Dynamo Luhansk, Halychyna Drohobych, Meliorator Kakhovka, Metalurh Kostiantynivka, Naftokhimik Kremenchuk, Nyva-Borysfen Boryspil, Ros Bila Tserkva, Shakhtar Pavlohrad, Tavria Kherson, Tytan Armiansk, Vahonobudivnyk Stakhanov, Voikovets Kerch, Yavir Krasnopillia, Zirka Kirovohrad)
 20 First League in whole (Artania Ochakiv, Avtomobilist Sumy, Desna Chernihiv, Dnipro Cherkasy, Dynamo-2 Kyiv, Evis Mykolaiv, Khimik Severodonetsk, Khimik Zhytomyr, Krystal Chortkiv, Metalurh Nikopol, Naftovyk Okhtyrka, SC Odesa, Podillia Khmelnytskyi, Polihraftekhnika Oleksandria, Prykarpattia Ivano-Frankivsk, Pryladyst Mukacheve, Skala Stryi, Stal Alchevsk, Vorskla Poltava, Zakarpattia Uzhhorod)
 1 Top League (Veres Rivne) – last season a wooden spoon candidated

Competition schedule

First preliminary round 
Almost all games were played on August 1, 1993. The game between Polihraftekhnika and Shakhtar took place on August 3.

Second preliminary round 
Almost all games were played on August 7, 1993. The game between Veres and Krok took place on August 11.

Bracket

First Elimination Round 

|}

First leg

Second leg 

Shakhtar won 8–1 on aggregate

Chornomorets won 4–0 on aggregate

Volyn won 2–2 on away goal rule

Bukovyna won 3–3 on away goal rule

Zorya won 2–2 on penalties

Karpaty won 3–0 on aggregate

Nyva won 2–1 on aggregate

Metalurh won 7–0 on aggregate

Nyva won 5–2 on aggregate

Tavria won 5–3 on aggregate

Kremina won 6–3 on aggregate

Temp won 3–1 on aggregate

Torpedo won 4–3 on aggregate

Veres won 3–1 on aggregate

Dnipro won 7–1 on aggregate

Dynamo won 7–1 on aggregate

Second Elimination Round 

|}

First leg

Second leg 

Volyn won 3–2 on aggregate

Karpaty won 8–3 on aggregate

Dnipro won 4–3 on aggregate

Chornomorets won 4–0 on aggregate

Tavriya won 3–0 on aggregate

Kremin won 3–2 on aggregate

Torpedo won 3–2 on aggregate

Veres won 1–1 on away goal rule

Quarterfinals 

|}

First leg

Second leg 

Karpaty won 3–2 on aggregate

Chornomorets won 4–0 on aggregate

Tavriya won 5–1 on aggregate

Veres won 2–2 on away goal rule

Semifinals 

|}

First leg

Second leg 

Tavriya won 2–0 on aggregate

Chornomorets won 2–1 on aggregate

Final 

The final was held at the NSC Olimpiysky on May 29, 1994, in Kyiv.

Top goalscorers

Attendances

Top attendances

See also 
 Ukrainian Premier League 1993-94
 1993-94 Ukrainian First League
 1993-94 Ukrainian Second League
 1993-94 Ukrainian Third League

References

External links 
 Calendar of Matches—Schedule of the Ukrainian Cup. 
 Info on the final 

Ukrainian Cup seasons
Cup
Ukrainian Cup